Formerly the Wappingers Falls Village Hall this building now houses the Police Department. It is located at the corner of South Avenue (NY 9D) and East Main Street in the village of Wappingers Falls, Dutchess County, New York.

History
It was originally built in 1940 as the village's new post office, a Works Progress Administration project. President Franklin D. Roosevelt took a personal interest in the project, as he already had with new post offices in other Dutchess County communities. He wanted it to be built of fieldstone in the style of many Dutch colonial houses in the Hudson Valley, and chose the Brewer-Mesier House in the village as the model for its design. R. Stanley Miller, a local architect who had already designed the similar Rhinebeck post office, was assigned the job.

In 1989, the building was listed on the National Register of Historic Places. It had already been a contributing property to the Wappingers Falls Historic District, added to the Register five years earlier. The U.S. Postal Service has since had to move to a larger building a few blocks away on East Main. The village moved most of its functions here and built a new wing — clapboard, not stone, but otherwise consistent with the original design — on the rear of the building to house its police department.

Murals
The old post office, now police station contains two Treasury Section of Fine Arts murals by Henry Billings. The paintings by Henry Billings show two views of the town's waterfall at different points in time. The building itself is walking distance from the actual waterfall. The murals are painted on chestnut panels and fill the triangular space where the ceiling of the building is pitched. The two views, one from 1780 and the other from 1880, face each other from opposite ends of the small building. The 1780 picture was inspired by the diary of the Marquis de Chastellux, who is shown in conversation with Peter Mesier, whose house the post office was modeled after. The 1880 scene was taken from an old painting of the falls when they were a major industrial water power source.

See also

Wappingers Falls Historic District
Other area post office buildings whose design Roosevelt influenced:
U.S. Post Office (Beacon, New York)
U.S. Post Office (Ellenville, New York)
U.S. Post Office (Hyde Park, New York)
U.S. Post Office (Poughkeepsie, New York)
U.S. Post Office (Rhinebeck, New York)

References

Former post office buildings
Village halls in the United States
Works Progress Administration in New York (state)
Government buildings completed in 1940
National Register of Historic Places in Dutchess County, New York
Post office buildings on the National Register of Historic Places in New York (state)
Individually listed contributing properties to historic districts on the National Register in New York (state)
Presidency of Franklin D. Roosevelt
Colonial Revival architecture in New York (state)
City and town halls on the National Register of Historic Places in New York (state)